Rabbitville Branch is a stream in Washington County in the U.S. state of Missouri. It is a tributary of Old Mines Creek.

Rabbitville Branch takes its name from the nearby community of Rabbitville, Missouri.

See also
List of rivers of Missouri

References

Rivers of Washington County, Missouri
Rivers of Missouri